Pico El Águila or Collado del Cóndor  is the milestone that stands at the highest elevation on the Venezuelan Transandean Highway (a branch of the Pan-American Highway) in the Cordillera de Mérida of Venezuela. Nearby stands a monument, sculpted by a Colombian artist, Marcos León Mariño, depicting a condor, commemorating an event in the campaign of the Liberator, Simón Bolivar. It is located in the state of Mérida and has an altitude of 4,118 meters.

References

See also

List of mountains in the Andes

Mountains of Venezuela
Extreme points of Venezuela